Hussein Ali Monzer (born 20 March 1997) is a Lebanese footballer who plays as a midfielder for  club Ahed.

International career 
Monzer played for the Lebanon national under-19 team during the 2016 AFC U-19 Championship qualification, playing three times and scoring once. He also played for the U23 team during the 2018 AFC U-23 Championship qualification, playing in all three games, as well as in two 2020 qualifications games, scoring against the Maldives in a 6–0 victory.

He made his debut for the senior team on 30 July 2019, in a 1–0 defeat against Iraq at the 2019 WAFF Championship.

Career statistics

International

Honours
Ahed
 AFC Cup: 2019
 Lebanese Premier League: 2016–17, 2017–18, 2018–19, 2021–22
 Lebanese FA Cup: 2017–18, 2018–19
 Lebanese Elite Cup: 2022; runner-up: 2021
 Lebanese Super Cup: 2017, 2018, 2019

Individual
 Lebanese Premier League Team of the Season: 2016–17, 2018–19

References

External links

 
 
 
 
 

1997 births
Living people
Lebanese footballers
Lebanon international footballers
Association football midfielders
Lebanese Premier League players
Al Ahed FC players
People from Marjeyoun District
Lebanon youth international footballers
AFC Cup winning players